Lucy Mary Jane Garnett (1849–1934) was a British folklorist and traveller.  She is best known for her work in Turkey, Northern Greece and Albania.  She also translated Greek folk songs, published in 1888.

She is listed in A Biographical Dictionary of Modern Rationalists.

Publications
Greek folk-songs from the Ottoman provinces of northern Hellas (1888, with John Stuart Stuart-Glennie)
Greek Folk-Songs from the Turkish Provinces of Greece (1890)
The Women of Turkey and their Folk-Lore (1890, with John Stuart Stuart-Glennie)
Turkish life in town and country (1904)
The Turkish people, their social life, religious beliefs and institutions, and domestic life (1909)

Turkey of the Ottomans (1911)
Mysticism and Magic in Turkey (1912)
Greece of the Hellenes (1914)
Ottoman Wonder Tales (1915)
Balkan Home Life (1917)

See also

Commentary on the Ottoman Empire
Bey 
Effendi 
Pasha
Robert College 
Demographics of the Ottoman Empire 
Education in the Ottoman Empire 
Languages of the Ottoman Empire

Collected stories
Note: For clarification, the author collected tales similar to the following stories:
E Bukura e Dheut (character)
Filek-Zelebi
Fortunatus (book) 
Maroula ‎ ‎
The Death of Koschei the Deathless 
The Golden-Headed Fish
The Sleeping Prince (fairy tale) 
The Story of Zoulvisia
The Three Enchanted Princes

References

English folklorists
Women folklorists
English travel writers
British women travel writers
1849 births
1934 deaths
English women non-fiction writers